Events from the year 1725 in art.

Events
 January 20 – The Academy of Fine Arts Vienna is refounded by Charles VI, Holy Roman Emperor, as the k.k. Hofakademie der Maler, Bildhauer und Baukunst, under the direction of the French-born court painter Jacob van Schuppen.
 A number of artists including Juan Vicente Ribera are appointed by the Council of Castile to develop a tax structure for artworks

Paintings

 Canaletto
 Doge's Palace
 Entrance to the Grand Canal: Looking East
 The Grand Canal from Rialto toward the North
 The Grand Canal near the Ponte di Rialto
 The Grand Canal with the Rialto Bridge in the Background
 Rio dei Mendicanti: Looking South
 Santi Giovanni e Paolo and the Scuola di San Marco
 Jean-Baptiste-Siméon Chardin – The Skate
 Sebastiano Ricci – Apotheosis of Saint Sebastian (approximate date)
 Jacob de Wit – Hercules on Mount Olympus (ceiling painting now at Waddesdon Manor, England)
 Johann Michael Rottmayr – Dome fresco, Karlskirche, Vienna
Francesco Solimena - The Expulsion of Heliodorus from the Temple (circa)

Births
 January 16 – Johann Anton de Peters, German painter and etcher (died 1795)
 February 17 – Joseph Ignatz Sadler, Czech fresco painter (died 1767)
 May 16 – Peder Als, Danish historical and portrait painter (died 1775)
 June 3 – Christoph Friedrich Reinhold Lisiewski, German portrait painter (died 1794)
 July 1 – Rhoda Delaval, English portrait painter (died 1757)
 August 21 – Jean-Baptiste Greuze, French painter (died 1805)
 September 7 – William Duesbury, English enameller and entrepreneur (died 1786)
 September 25 – Francesco Bartolozzi, Italian engraver (died 1815)
 October 7 (bapt.) – Francis Swaine, English marine painter (died 1782)
 November 22 – Ignaz Günther, German sculptor and woodcarver within the Bavarian rococo tradition (died 1775)
 date unknown
 Guillaume Philippe Benoist, French line engraver (died 1770)
 Giuseppe Canale, Italian painter and engraver (died 1802)
 Domenico Cunego, Italian printmaker (died 1803)
 James Gabriel Huquier, French portrait painter and engraver (died 1805)
 Therese Maron, German painter active in Rome (died 1806)
 Nicola Peccheneda, Italian painter (died 1804)
 Antonio Ponz, Spanish painter (died 1792)
 Juan Ramírez de Arellano, Spanish Baroque painter (died 1782)

Deaths
 February 5 – Christoph Weigel the Elder, German engraver and art dealer (born 1654)
 March 2 – José Benito de Churriguera, Spanish architect and sculptor (born 1665)
 April 18 – Antonio Calza, Italian painter of historical and battle-scenes (born 1658)
 May 6 – Bernardo Schiaffino, Italian sculptor (born 1678)
 May 23 – Anna Maria Schmilau, Swedish tapestry artist
 September 2 – Charles-François Poerson, French painter (born 1653)
 September 11 – Giuseppe Gambarini, Italian painter of frescoes (born 1680)
 October – José de Mora, Spanish sculptor (born 1642)
 date unknown
 Gioseffo Maria Bartolini, Italian painter (born 1657)
 Giovanni Girolamo Bonesi, Italian painter (born 1653)
 Bernard Lens II, English engraver, pioneer of mezzotint technique and publisher (born 1659)
 probable – Jan Soukens, Dutch Golden Age painter (born c.1650)

 
Years of the 18th century in art
1720s in art